Cupressus chengiana is a species of conifer in the family Cupressaceae.

The tree is endemic to  China, found only in Gansu and Sichuan Provinces.

References

External links

chengiana
Endemic flora of China
Flora of Gansu
Flora of Sichuan
Trees of China
Vulnerable flora of Asia
Plants described in 1964
Taxonomy articles created by Polbot